Stipa borysthenica is a perennial bunchgrass species in the family Poaceae, native to Europe and Asia.

It is a common species in a wide area of Kazakhstan and southern parts of Russia. In many European countries (e.g. Czech Republic, Slovakia, Poland, Hungary, Ukraine) it is a post-glacial relict and protected endangered plant.

External links

borystenica
Bunchgrasses of Asia
Bunchgrasses of Europe
Flora of the Czech Republic
Flora of Hungary
Flora of Kazakhstan
Flora of Poland
Flora of Russia
Flora of Ukraine